Delaware Township is one of the twelve townships of Defiance County, Ohio, United States. The 2010 census found 2,134 people in the township, 1,307 of whom lived in the unincorporated portions of the township.

Geography
Located in the central part of the county, it borders the following townships:
Washington Township - north
Tiffin Township - northeast corner
Noble Township - east
Defiance Township - southeast
Emerald Township, Paulding County - south
Crane Township, Paulding County - southwest corner
Mark Township - west
Farmer Township - northwest corner

The village of Sherwood is located in western Delaware Township.

Name and history
Statewide, other Delaware Townships are located in Delaware and Hancock counties.

Government
The township is governed by a three-member board of trustees, who are elected in November of odd-numbered years to a four-year term beginning on the following January 1. Two are elected in the year after the presidential election and one is elected in the year before it. There is also an elected township fiscal officer, who serves a four-year term beginning on April 1 of the year after the election, which is held in November of the year before the presidential election. Vacancies in the fiscal officership or on the board of trustees are filled by the remaining trustees.

Transportation
Significant highways in Delaware Township include:
County Road 424, which travels east–west through the southern half of the township
U.S. Route 127, which travels north–south through Sherwood in the western half of the township
State Route 18, which travels east–west through the center of the township

References

External links
County website

Townships in Defiance County, Ohio
Townships in Ohio